The 2022 Brussels Cycling Classic was the 102nd edition of the Brussels Cycling Classic road cycling one day race, which was held on 5 June 2022 as part of the 2022 UCI ProSeries calendar.

Teams 
Eleven UCI WorldTeams, seven UCI ProTeams, and two UCI Continental teams make up the twenty teams that participate in the race.

UCI WorldTeams

 
 
 
 
 
 
 
 
 
 
 

UCI ProTeams

 
 
 
 
 
 
 

UCI Continental Teams

Result

References

External links 

2022 Brussels Cycling Classic
Brussels Cycling Classic
Brussels Cycling Classic
Brussels Cycling Classic